The Booktrust Early Years Awards, originally the Sainsbury’s Baby Book Award(s), was a set of annual literary prizes for children's picture books. It was administered by Booktrust, an independent charity that promotes books and reading; from 1999 to 2004. The Booktrust Early Years Awards was sponsored by the supermarket chain Sainsbury's with its last award give in 2010.

As of 2005 there were three categories: the Baby Book Award, the Pre-School Award, and the Best Emerging Illustrator Award. The winners in each category received £2000 with the Emerging Illustrator also receiving a specially commissioned award. The publishers of the winning books were given awards too.

List of prize winners

2010
 Baby Book Award: Giles Andreae, I Love My Mummy (Orchard Books)
 Pre-School Award: Chris Wormell, One Smart Fish (Red Fox)
 Best Emerging Illustrator Award: Levi Pinfold, for The Django (Templar)
2009
 Baby Book Award: Ed Vere, Chick (Puffin)
 Pre-School Award: Mara Bergman & Nick Maland, Oliver Who Travelled Far and Wide (Hodder Children's Books)
 Best Emerging Illustrator Award: Katie Cleminson for Box of Tricks (Jonathan Cape)
2008
 Baby Book Award: Georgie Birkett, Is This My Nose? (Red Fox)
 Pre-School Award: Jeanne Willis & Gwen Millward, The Bog Baby (Puffin Books)
 Best Emerging Illustrator Award: Tim Hopgood, for Here Comes Frankie! (Macmillan Children's Books)
2007
 Baby Book Award: Jess Stockham, Tucking In! (Child's Play)
 Pre-School Award: Polly Dunbar, Penguin (Walker Books)
 Best Emerging Illustrator Award: Emily Gravett, for Monkey and Me (Macmillan)
2006
 Baby Book Award: Mandy Stanley, How Do You Feel? (HarperCollins Children's)
 Pre-School Award: Sam Lloyd, Mr. Pusskins (Orchard Books)
 Best New Illustrator Award: Catherine Rayner, for Augustus and His Smile (Little Tiger Press)
2005
 Baby Book Award: Lara Jones, Poppy Cat's Farm (Campbell Books)
 Pre-School Award: Jack Tickle, The Very Dizzy Dinosaur (Little Tiger Press)
 Best New Illustrator Award: Kanako Usui, for The Fantastic Mr Wani (Little Tiger Press)
2004
 Baby Book Award: David Ellwand & Mike Jolley, I Love You! (Templar)
 Pre-School Award: Julia Donaldson & Axel Scheffler, The Snail and the Whale (Macmillan)
 Best New Illustrator Award: Polly Horner, for Polly and the North Star (Orion)
2003
Sam Lloyd, Happy Dog, Sad Dog (Little Tiger Press)
2002
Annie Kubler, Head, Shoulders, Knees and Toes (Child's Play)
2001
Sandra Lousada, Baby Faces (Baby Campbell)
2000
Alex Ayliffe, Boo Barney (Orchard Books)
1999
Helen Oxenbury, Tickle, Tickle (Walker Books)

Shortlists

2008
 Baby Book Award:
Angela Brooksbank, Baby's Very First Book: Day (Campbell Books)
Dawn Sirett & Rachael Parfitt, Baby Loves Peekaboo! (Dorling Kindersley)
Tim Warnes & Jane Chapman, Daddy Hug (HarperCollins Children's Books)
Justine Smith & Fiona Land, Baby Touch: Playtime Book and DVD (Ladybird)
Georgie Birkett, Is This My Nose? (Red Fox)
Emily Hawkins & Emma Dodd, Amazing Baby: Rainbow Fun! (Templar)
 Pre-School Award:
David Bedford & Russell Julian, It's a George Thing! (Egmont Books)
Joanna Harrison, Grizzly Dad (David Fickling Books)
Andy Cutbill & Russell Ayto, The Cow That Laid an Egg (HarperCollins Children's Books)
Chris Riddell, Wendel's Workshop (Macmillan Children's Books)
Jeanne Willis & Gwen Millward, The Bog Baby (Puffin Books)
Jeanne Willis & Garry Parsons, There's An Ouch in My Pouch! (Puffin Books)
 Best Emerging Illustrator Award:
Victoria Ball, for That Yucky Love Thing (Gullane Children's Books)
Tim Hopgood, for Here Comes Frankie! (Macmillan Children's Books)
Alex T. Smith, for Eliot Jones, Midnight Superhero (Scholastic Children's Books)
Joe Berger, for Bridget Fidget (Puffin Books)
Gwen Millward, for The Bog Baby (Puffin Books)
Vicky White, for Ape (Walker Books)
2007
 Baby Book Award:
David McKee, Elmer’s First Counting Book (Andersen Press)
Justine Smith & Fiona Land, Baby Touch: Noisy Book (Ladybird)
Justine Smith & Fiona Land, Baby Touch: Peekaboo Book (Ladybird)
Jess Stockham, Looking Good! (Child’s Play)
Jess Stockham, Tucking In! (Child's Play)
Dr Miriam Stoppard, Happy Baby (Dorling Kindersley)
 Pre-School Award:
Mara Bergman & Nick Maland, Oliver Who Would Not Sleep (Hodder Children’s Books)
Emma Chichester Clark, Eliza and the Moonchild (Andersen Press)
Cressida Cowell & Neal Layton, That Rabbit Belongs to Emily Brown (Orchard Books)
Polly Dunbar, Penguin (Walker Books)
Joel Stewart, Dexter Bexley and his Big Blue Beastie (Doubleday)
Jeanne Willis & Tony Ross, Grill Pan Eddy (Andersen Press)
 Best Emerging Illustrator Award:
Jason Chapman, for Ted, Bo and Diz: The First Adventure (Little Tiger Press)
Emily Gravett, for Monkey and Me (Macmillan)
Viviane Schwarz, for Timothy and the Strong Pyjamas (Alison Green Books)
Anna Wadham, for The Ant and the Big Bad Bully Goat - written by Andrew Fusek Peters (Child’s Play)
2006
 Baby Book Award:
Marie Birkinshaw & Kate Merritt, Night, Night, Baby (Ladybird)
Kathy Henderson & Paul Howard, Look at You! (Walker Books)
Annie Kubler, Peek-a-Boo! (Child’s Play)
Luana Rinaldo, Clackety-Clacks: Bee (Campbell Books)
Mandy Stanley, How Do You Feel? (HarperCollins Children's)
Fiona Watt & Catherine-Anne MacKinnon, Sleepy Baby (Usborne)
 Pre-School Award:
Jonathan Allen, I'm Not Cute! (Boxer Books)
Nick Butterworth, Tiger (HarperCollins Children’s)
Emma Dodd, What Pet to Get? (Templar Publishing)
Emily Gravett, Orange Pear Apple Bear (Macmillan Children’s)
Oliver Jeffers, Lost and Found (HarperCollins Children’s)
Sam Lloyd, Mr. Pusskins (Orchard Books)
 Best Emerging Illustrator Award:
Sebastien Braun, for I Love My Mummy (Boxer Books)
Petra Brown, for If Big Can... I Can - written by Beth Shoshan (Meadowside)
Natalie Chivers, for Dad’s Bug Bear - written by Peter Dixon (Red Fox)
Catherine Rayner, for Augustus and His Smile (Little Tiger Press)
2005
 Baby Book Award:
John Butler, Can You Cuddle Like a Koala? (Little Orchard)
DK Team, Bathtime Peekaboo! (Dorling Kindersley)
Lara Jones, Poppy Cat's Farm (Campbell Books)
Tony Maddox, Not So Loud, Oliver! (Little Orchard)
Joanne Partis, Look at Me! (Chrysalis Books)
Nicola Smee, No Bed Without Ted (Bloomsbury)
 Pre-School Award:
Jez Alborough, Duck's Key Where Can it be? (HarperCollins Children's)
Caroline Jayne Church, Pond Goose (OUP)
Atsuko Morozumi, My Friend Gorilla (Mathew Price Books)
Jan Ormerod & Lindsey Gardiner, Doing the Animal Bop (OUP)
Jack Tickle, The Very Dizzy Dinosaur (Little Tiger Press)
Kaye Umansky & Chris Fisher, A Chair for Baby Bear (OUP)
 Best New Illustrator Award:
Heather Allen, for Little Green Monsters - written by Alec Sillifant (Meadowside)
Uwe Mayer, for Eric the Liontamer - written by Rachel Elliot (Meadowside)
Rob Scotton, for Russell the Sheep (HarperCollins Children's)
Kanako Usui, for The Fantastic Mr Wani (Little Tiger Press)
2003
Roger Priddy, Baby Activity Centre (Priddy Books)
Sam Lloyd, Happy Dog, Sad Dog (Little Tiger Press)
Fiona Watt & Rachel Wells, That's Not My Bear (Usborne Publishing)
DK Team, Baby Fun: Five in the Bed (Dorling Kindersley)
Lara Jones, Goodnight, Poppy Cat (Campbell Books)
Amanda Wood & Fiona Macmillan, Baby Boo! (Templar).
2001
Debi Gliori, Where, Oh Where, is Baby Bear? (Little Orchard)
Annie Kubler, If You're Happy and You Know It... (Child's Play)
Jo Lodge, Baby's Very First Book: Farm (Baby Campbell)
Sandra Lousada, Baby Faces (Baby Campbell)
Mandy Ross & Kate Merritt, Peekaboo Baby! (Ladybird)
Nicola Smee, Sleepyhead (Baby Campbell)
1999
Steve Bland, Woof! (Macmillan)
Lucy Cousins, Humpty Dumpty and Other Nursery Rhymes (Macmillan)
Debbie MacKinnon & Anthea Sieveking, Find My Cake! (Frances Lincoln)
Jan Ormerod, Peek-a-Boo! (Dutton)
Helen Oxenbury, Tickle, Tickle (Walker Books)
Nick Sharratt, A Bear with a Pear (Macmillan)

See also

References

External links
Booktrust Early Years Awards 
Booktrust Early Years Awards at Booktrust 
Sainsbury's Baby Book Award at Booktrust 
Booktrust Early Years Awards shortlists 2005
Sainsbury's Baby Book Award shortlist 2001 
Sainsbury's Baby Book Award shortlist 1999 

British children's literary awards
Picture book awards
Illustrated book awards
Awards established in 1999
1999 establishments in the United Kingdom
2010 disestablishments in the United Kingdom